Luis Villegas (born July 28, 1969) is an American guitarist best known for his debut CD Cafe Olé, which mixed new-age music, flamenco, and jazz and garnered a spot on the Grammy ballot for Best New Age Album of the Year in 1999. He is known for using a technique of playing fast, intricate lines by using the fingernail of his right index finger in place of a guitar pick. He also had a small role as a member of a band in the film Collateral starring Tom Cruise and Jamie Foxx. He is currently a member of the group "Heavy Mellow" along with founder Benjamin Woods and percussionist Mike Bennett.

Early life
Luis Villegas is a first-generation Mexican-American born in East Los Angeles, California, U.S. A self-taught guitarist who plays flamenco, jazz, rock, blues and classical, he grew up listening to traditional Mexican Ranchero music. As a boy, he met the famous Mexican Ranchero singer, Vicente Fernandez. However, it was not Mexican music that attracted him to the guitar but rock and roll because the heavy metal explosion was in full swing in Los Angeles.

Career

Early years
Luis played in rock bands all through High School and into college garnering some mild success with the band Slumlord in 1988 and 1989 fronted by Scott Kidd who later went on to become a famous radio DJ known as Uncle Scotty. Luis quit Slumlord in 1990 when he found he needed a different stimulus to fuel his musical visions.

Experimental years
That new vision began to grow when he picked up the acoustic guitar and started experimenting with classical, jazz, and even flamenco music. Being self-taught, he emulated guitarists from the records he listened to like Wes Montgomery, Paco De Lucia, and Al Di Meola among others. Many of his current techniques are based on flamenco guitar techniques such as rasgueado, alzapua and picado.

He practiced intensely, concentrating on the incredible techniques that would garner him so many accolades. Those techniques and the music he heard inside himself, was channeled through an instrument from his youth: the Spanish guitar.

In 1991, he recorded a demo of original material in a style that was very new to American audiences. This new style was being made popular at the time by artists such as The Gipsy Kings, and Strunz and Farah.

Luis then formed a band to play some of this new material. The band, which originally consisted of friends from rock bands he had played with, formed a huge following in the Los Angeles area.

Successful years
In 1996, Luis recorded and released his first CD independently entitled Café Ole, produced by David Scheffler and Guillermo Guzman. Members of his band as well as studio musicians, Gregg Bissonette, Abraham Laboriel, and The Rippingtons' Steve Reid, among others lent their talents to the CD. Less than a year later, Luis signed his first recording contract with Domo Records, and affiliate of EMI records.

Domo/EMI released Café Ole with a new cover and some newly recorded songs in 1998. The album earned a Grammy nomination for Best New Age Album in 1999.

Even larger audiences found Villegas via his next CD, Spanish Kiss (Baja/TSR) in 2000 and the numerous compilation CDs he appeared in during the following two years. Guitarists worldwide took notice when Villegas' name appeared alongside guitar icons such as Al Di Meola, Steve Morse, Ottmar Liebert, Jesse Cook and Strunz & Farah.

Casa Villegas (Baja/TSR), his third CD, was released in 2003 and marked Luis' debut as a producer as well as performer. It stayed on the SmoothJazz.com charts for six weeks after its release on the strength of the single "Whittier Blvd."

Luis was asked by his label, Baja/TSR, to create a Christmas album. After working on it for some time, negotiations for producing the album fell through and Luis subsequently left the label to pursue his career as an independent artist. The Christmas album, Guitarras de Navidad found its way to his fans anyway. Then, in 2007, the album was updated with several additional songs and a new cover and licensed to the Tenure label, under the guidance of Juan Carlos Quintero. It was released in August in good time for the 2007 holiday season.

Luis has worked with many of the leading artists and musicians in the world. He recorded a duet with classical guitarist Liona Boyd in 2001 which was nominated for a Juno Award (the Canadian Grammy). In 2003, he performed with Nuevo Flamenco guitarist Jesse Cook, and performed for Carmen Electra and Dave Navarro's much-publicized wedding on MTV in 2004. He's also worked with Janet Jackson, Marc Anthony, and Plácido Domingo.

In December, 2004 the Luis Villegas Official Fan Club was formed, and the members continue to fully support Luis’ music.

On December 21, 2007, Luis was featured in an interview with Val Zavala and performed with several of his band members on the PBS television show "Life and Times."

Heavy Mellow
Luis is currently performing in a band called Heavy Mellow founded by Los Angeles flamenco guitarist Benjamin Woods.  Heavy Mellow performs heavy metal classics by the likes of Iron Maiden, Judas Priest, Black Sabbath, Ozzy Osbourne and others but in a flamenco trio set up of two flamenco guitars and a cajon player.  They have found much success performing on music cruises such as The Monsters of Rock, The Moody Blues Cruise and YES Cruise to the Edge.  Heavy Mellow have one self-titled album released in 2013.

Personal life
Luis resides in Los Angeles, CA with his wife, Gloria, and two children Christian and Krista. He is currently teaching guitar at Santa Monica High School as adjunct faculty for Santa Monica College and flamenco guitar at Orange County High School of the Arts as part of its Instrumental Music Conservatory.

Discography

Albums
Cafe Olé (1998) Nominated for a Grammy Award for Best New Age Album
Spanish Kiss (2000)
Casa Villegas (2003)
Guitarras De Navidad (2007)
Eastside Democracy (2016)

Singles
 Eastside (2013)
 Rainbow in the Dark (2016)
 Can’t Take My Eyes Off You (2021)
 Vente Pa Madrid (2021)
 Breathe (2021)
 Cuban Breeze (2021)

Other compilation appearances
Music for the Spirit, Volume 2 (1999) (Domo Records)
Guitar Greats: The Best of New Flamenco - Volume I (2000) (Baja/TSR Records)
Music for the Spirit, Volume 3 (2001) (Domo Records)
Tabu: Mondo Flamenco (2001) (Narada)
Journey to the Heart IV: Music for Massage (2002) (Domo Records)
Camino Latino / Latin Journey - Liona Maria Boyd (2002) (Moston)
Guitar Greats: The Best of New Flamenco - Volume II (2002) (Baja/TSR Records)
Barcelona: Music Celebrating the Flavors of the World (2004) (Williams Sonoma)
Gypsy Spice: Best Of New Flamenco (2009) (Baja/TSR Records)
The World Of The Spanish Guitar Vol. 1 (2011) (Higher Octave Music)
Guitar Greats: The Best of New Flamenco - Volume III (2013) (Baja/TSR Records)

Musicians
Luis has performed with many artists, such as: 
 Jackson Browne: singer/guitarist
 Abraham Laboriel: bass
 Alberto Salas: piano
 Gregg Bissonette: drums
 David Garfield: piano
 Carlos Rodriguez: piano
 Jose Garcia: guitar/vocals
 Juan Carlos Portillo: bass
 Rene Camacho: bass
 Chris Trujillo: percussion
 Ramon Yslas: percussion
 Jorge Villanueva: percussion
 Pablo Correa: drums
 Paul Tchounga: drums
 Andy Abad: guitar
 Guillermo Guzman: bass
 Luis Perez: percussion
 Joey Heredia: drums
 Ricardo “Tiki” Pasillas: drums
 Michito Sanchez: perc
 Rique Pantoja: piano
 Charlie Bisharat: violin
 Steve Reid: percussion
 Arturo Solar: trumpet
 Garret Smith: trombone
 Carlos Cuevas: piano
 Fausto Cuevas: percussion
 Ronnie Gutierrez: percussion
 Ricky Adorno: bass
 Scott Vomvolakis: perc
 Keith Dasalla: perc
 Rene Castro: percussion
 Jesse Stern:  bass
 Cassio Duarte: percussion

See also
New Flamenco
Flamenco rumba

External links
 Luis Villegas | Official Website
 

Living people
American musicians of Mexican descent
1969 births
Musicians from California
Domo Records artists